Primacy  may refer to:

 an office of the Primate (bishop)
 the supremacy of one bishop or archbishop over others, most notably:
 Primacy of Peter, ecclesiological doctrine on the primacy of Peter the Apostle
 Primacy of the Roman Pontiff, ecclesiological doctrine on the primacy of the Roman See
 Primacy of the Five Sees, ecclesiological doctrine on the primacy of the five major patriarchates (pentarchy)
 Primacy of Jerusalem in Christianity, ecclesiological doctrine on the primacy of the See of Jerusalem 
 Primacy of Canterbury, the supremacy of the Archbishop of Canterbury over the Archbishop of York
 Primacy of Jerusalem in Judaism, religious primacy of the Holy City of Jerusalem in Judaism
 Aramaic primacy, a scholarly theory in the Christian Bible studies
 Primacy of the House of Commons, a political system based on the primacy of the House of Commons over the House of Lords
 Primacy of European Union law, a legal concept in the international law
 Primacy effect, a concept in psychology and sociology
 Primacy (company), a digital marketing agency based in Connecticut, USA
 Primacy, a suburb of Bangor, County Down

See also
 Primate (disambiguation)
 Primacy of Jerusalem (disambiguation)